

University 

 Kerala Veterinary and Animal Sciences University, Pookode (14 km from Kalpetta)

Professional education 
 College of Veterinary and Animal Sciences at Pookode (14 km from Kalpetta) 
 Oriental School of Hotel Management located at Lakkidi (15 km from Kalpetta)
 Oriental College of Hotel Management and Culinary Arts at Vythiri (8 km from Kalpetta)
 DM WIMS Medical College located at Meppadi (15 km) is the only Medical College in Wayanad district
 College of Dairy Science and Technology, Pookode offers B.Tech degree course in Dairy Science & Technology
 Oriental Institute for Management Studies, Vythiri
 College of Engineering, Thalapuzha, Wayanad 
 DM WIMS Nursing College located at Meppadi 
 Centre for Computer Science and Information Technology of Calicut University at Muttil offers MCA (Master of Computer Application) course
 B.Ed Centre of Calicut University is situated at Kaniyambetta (10 km from Kalpetta)
 Fatima Mata Nursing School, Kalpetta
 Government Polytechnic College, Meppadi
 KMM Government ITI, Kalpetta 
 Face Psycho Clinic and Training Centre (functioning inside Shanthi Pain & Palliative Care Society building) offers Calicut University's Diploma Course in Psychological Counseling

Arts and science colleges 
 NMSM Government College, Kalpetta (Neelikandy Moideen Sahib Memorial)
 WMO Arts & Science College, Muttil
 Green Mount Arts & Science College, Padinjarethara
 PM Charitable Trust, Arts & Science College, Meppadi

Schools 
 Kendriya Vidyalaya, Kalpetta
 WMO English Academy, Muttil
 SKMJ Higher Secondary School, Kalpetta
 NSS English Medium School, Kalpetta
 De Paul Public School, Kalpetta
 MCF Public School, Kalpetta
 St Joseph's Convent School, Kalpetta
 Government Higher Secondary School, Munderi, Kalpetta
HIM UP School, Kalpetta
Government LP School, Kalpetta
SDM LP School, Kalpetta
 Al Falah English Medium School, Kalpetta
 Kristhuraja Public School, Vellaramkunnu
 KeyPees International School, Ootty Road, Kunnumbetta

References

Kalpetta area